Dermophis is a genus of worm-like amphibians in the family Dermophiidae, the Neotropical and Tropical African caecilians. They are found in the Middle America between southern Mexico and northwestern Colombia. Common names Mexican caecilians or Neotropical caecilians are sometimes used for them.

Species 
The genus has seven species:

Description
The body has numerous folds, from 97 to 258, with considerable variations both between individuals within a species and between the species. There is a tentacle about halfway between eye and nostril. The lower jaw has only one row of teeth. Living specimens are very dark purple to purple-black above and creamy white below.

Based on external morphology, three groups of species can be recognized:
 large caecilians with numerous secondary folds: D. mexicanus and D. oaxacae
 moderate-sized caecilians with numerous secondary folds: D. costaricense, D. glandulosus, D. gracilior
 small to moderate-sized caecilians with few secondary folds: D. occidentalis, D. parviceps

References

 
Amphibian genera
Amphibians of Central America
Amphibians of South America
Taxa named by Wilhelm Peters
Taxonomy articles created by Polbot